The 1977 Georgia Tech Yellow Jackets football team represented the Georgia Institute of Technology during the 1977 NCAA Division I football season. The Yellow Jackets were led by fourth-year head coach Pepper Rodgers, and played their home games at Grant Field in Atlanta.

Schedule

Sources:

Roster
Freeman Colbert
PK Mike Dassel
Drew Hill
QB Gary Lanier
Reggie Wilkes

References

Georgia Tech
Georgia Tech Yellow Jackets football seasons
Georgia Tech Yellow Jackets football